Fan Liang-shiow (born 15 August 1946) is a Taiwanese politician. He served as the Minister of the Public Construction Commission of the Executive Yuan from 2008 to 2011.

Education
Fan obtained his master's degree in traffic and transportation from National Chiao Tung University.

References

1946 births
Living people
Political office-holders in the Republic of China on Taiwan